Praan Jaaye Par Shaan Na Jaaye is a 2003 Indian Hindi-language black comedy film directed by Sanjay Jha which depicts various aspects of chawl culture in Mumbai. It was inspired by the Malayalam film Vietnam Colony. This film was co-produced by Raj Lalchandani, Mahesh Manjrekar, Asoo Nihlani and Sagoon Wagh. The film stars Aman Verma and Rinke Khanna and features a huge supporting cast of Bollywood actors.

Plot
Aman Joshi (Aman Verma) is on a research assignment. His subject is the chawl dwellers in Bombay City. He rents a small tenement there and talks to the people living there. He soon gets involved in their lives, and even gets attracted to plain-looking Suman (Rinke Khanna). Aman's kindness is mistaken for generosity by all the chawl dwellers, and they swarm him for his money, trying to get loans and gifts, to improve their lives. Then the lives of this small community are turned upside down, when the owner Parveen Seth (Sachin Khedekar) announces that he intends to tear the building down.

Cast
 Aman Verma as Aman Joshi
 Rinke Khanna as Suman
 Raveena Tandon as Laxmi Rathod
 Namrata Shirodkar as Mona
 Dia Mirza as Saundarya
 Divya Dutta as Dulari
 Shweta Menon as Sheela
 Sachin Khedekar as Parveen Seth
 Vijay Raaz as Ganpat (Narrator)
 Mahesh Manjrekar as Munna Bhai Hatela
 Sushmita Sen as herself (Narrator / Special Appearance)
 Shivaji Satam as Pandhari
 Sayaji Shinde as Sayaji Rane
 Vivek Shauq as Sukhwinder
 Reema Lagoo
 Shakti Kapoor
 Bharat Jadhav as Mahendra Rathod
 Makarand Anaspure as Venkat
 Atisha Naik

Music
 "Aye Aye Ya Mujhe Isse Pyaar Hua" - Daboo Malik, Vinod Rathod
 "Hum Tere Sanam Na Hote" - Vinod Rathod, Alka Yagnik 
 "Chaalee Hamko Jaan Se Pyaaree Hai" - Vinod Rathod, Nitin Raikwar 
 "Kuch Nayi Nayi Wo Baat Thi" - Sonu Nigam
 "Lagi Ye Lagi" - Vinod Rathod
 "Loan De Baba" - Vinod Rathod
 "Background Score" - Rahul Ranade

References

External links
 

2003 films
Films set in Mumbai
2000s Hindi-language films
Films scored by Daboo Malik
Films scored by Nitin Raikwar
Indian comedy-drama films
Indian black comedy films
Indian satirical films